Alphonsea sclerocarpa is a species of plant in the Annonaceae family. It is endemic to South India, and Sri Lanka.

References

sclerocarpa
Flora of Sri Lanka
Flora of India (region)